Anse may refer to:

Places
 Anse, Belgium, a municipality in Belgium
 Anse, Rhône, a commune in France
 Anse-Bertrand, a commune in Guadeloupe
 Anse-Bleue, New Brunswick, a community in Canada
 Anse, Mississippi, an unincorporated community in the United States

Other uses
 Anse is French for bay or cove. 
 Anse Bundren, character in As I Lay Dying
 Anse Moore (1917-1993), American baseball player

See also
Ans (disambiguation)